Myrmeciphis is a genus of mites in the family Laelapidae.

Species
 Myrmeciphis crawleianus Hull, 1923

References

Laelapidae